Minsk-1 Airport  was a Belarusian airport located within the city limits of Minsk, just a few kilometres south from the centre.

History
Minsk-1 was built in 1933. It was the major airport of Minsk until the new airport Minsk-2, now named Minsk National Airport, opened in 1982.

In February 2006 a decision was made to transfer a Minsk aircraft repair plant situated on the Minsk-1 territory out of the city line. 320 ha of freed land will be transferred to the city authorities for real estate development. Commercial flights were scheduled until 26 October 2012 when flights to Moscow-Vnukovo operated by UTair Aviation moved to the larger Minsk National Airport. 

The airport officially shut down on 23 December 2015.

References

External links

 NOAA/NWS current weather observations
 ASN Accident history for UMMM

Airports built in the Soviet Union
Airports in Belarus
Defunct airports
Transport in Minsk
Buildings and structures in Minsk
Airports disestablished in 2015